Barclay George "Buddy" Reid (born 4 November 1940) is a former cricketer who played first-class cricket for Ceylon in the 1960s.

Buddy Reid attended St. Thomas' College, Mount Lavinia, and the University of Colombo, where he studied medicine. He made his first-class debut for the Ceylon Board President's XI in a Gopalan Trophy match against Madras in March 1964, batting at number three and scoring 46 (the innings top score) and 22 in a six-wicket victory.
 
He played in most of Ceylon's matches for the next six years, usually opening the batting and occasionally bowling leg-breaks. He was selected to tour England with the Ceylon team in 1968, but the tour was cancelled just before it was due to begin.

He captained Ceylon against MCC in 1968–69, making his highest score, 50 not out, in the second innings. The previous season he had taken his best bowling figures, 4 for 19, for Ceylon Transport Board in the Moin-ud-Dowlah Gold Cup Tournament.

He and his wife, daughter and son moved to Australia, where he continued to practise medicine.

Reid also represented Ceylon and Australia at table tennis. He was Ceylon's national men's singles champion in 1959, 1960 and 1962, and doubles champion six times. In 2016 he became the World Over-75 Table Tennis Champion, winning the singles title in Alicante, Spain. He added the World Over-75 doubles title in Las Vegas in 2018, when he teamed with Australian team-mate Igor Klaf.

In September 2018, Reid was one of 49 former Sri Lankan cricketers felicitated by Sri Lanka Cricket, to honour them for their services before Sri Lanka became a full member of the International Cricket Council (ICC).

Since at least 2009, Reid has been a tutor of medical students in the Monash University Faculty of Medicine, Nursing and Health Sciences.

References

External links

1940 births
Living people
All-Ceylon cricketers
Alumni of S. Thomas' College, Mount Lavinia
Alumni of the University of Colombo
Sri Lankan emigrants to Australia
Australian male table tennis players
People from British Ceylon
20th-century Sri Lankan physicians
Sri Lankan table tennis players